Caimitillo is a town and corregimiento in the Panamá Province of Panama.

Sources 
World Gazeteer: Panama – World-Gazetteer.com

Populated places in Panamá Province
Panamá District